Berkeley Basil Moreton, 4th Earl of Ducie (18 July 1834 – 7 August 1924), was a British peer and a politician and pastoralist in Australia. He was a Member of both the Queensland Legislative Assembly and the Queensland Legislative Council.

Early life
Berkeley Basil Moreton was born on 18 July 1834 at Woodchester, Gloucestershire, England, the son of Henry Reynolds-Moreton, 2nd Earl of Ducie and his wife Elizabeth, daughter of Lord Sherborne. He was educated at Rugby School and attended university at Magdalen College at Oxford.

Australian years
Berkeley Moreton arrived in Australia on 27 November 1855. Moreton became a grazier on Wetheron Station in the North Burnett Region of Queensland. He became known in the area as a good horseman and horsebreeder, for providing hospitality, and for being handy with his hands in a fight. In 1862 he married Emily Eleanor, daughter of John Kent, Esq., F.R.G.S. Commissioner of Crown Lands Mitchell District, and Late Assistant Commissary General to H.M. Forces. In 1869 his brother Seymour married another of John Kent's daughters. Several children were born to Berkeley Moreton and his wife while at Wetheron Station.

On 30 August 1870, he became a Member of the Queensland Legislative Assembly when he was elected to the seat of Burnett; that term finished on 24 October 1871.

On 7 November 1873, he again became a Member of the Queensland Legislative Assembly when he was elected to the seat of Maryborough; that term finished on 16 March 1875.

In March 1880, he was the founding chairman of the Rawbelle Divisional Board, a local government area surrounding the town of Gayndah.

On 1 October 1883, he became a Member of the Queensland Legislative Assembly for the third time when he was elected (again) to the seat of Burnett, which he held until 12 May 1888. During this period, he briefly held the role of Queensland Postmaster-General from 17 March 1885 to 22 April 1885. This was followed by three years as the Secretary for Public Instruction from 17 April 1885 to 13 June 1888, which was partly concurrent by his two-year stint as Colonial Secretary from 1 April 1886 to 13 June 1888.

On 25 May 1888, he was appointed to be a Member of the Queensland Legislative Council. Although such appointments were for life, he chose to resign on 25 June 1891.

On 17 July 1901, he was appointed again for life to the Queensland Legislative Council; this appointment ended on 23 March 1922 when the Council was abolished.

Peerage
On 28 October 1921, Berkeley Moreton's brother Henry Reynolds-Moreton, 3rd Earl of Ducie, died and Berkeley Moreton became the 4th Earl of Ducie. As the third Earl had a son Henry Reynolds-Moreton, Lord Moreton, Berkeley Moreton had not expected to inherit the title, but that changed on 28 February 1920 when his nephew Henry Reynolds-Moreton predeceased his father, the third Earl.

He left Queensland for England on 23 February 1922 to take possession of the Gloucestershire estate and take his seat in the House of Lords.

Moreton died in 1924 and was buried in St Leonard's Churchyard, Tortworth.

Arms

References

External links

1834 births
1924 deaths
People from Woodchester
People educated at Rugby School
Alumni of Magdalen College, Oxford
English landowners
Moreton, Berkeley Basil
Moreton, Berkeley Basil
Earls in the Peerage of the United Kingdom
Pre-Separation Queensland